Abdul Majid Khan may refer to:
 Abdul Majid Khan (detainee) (born 1953), Afghan national detained by US DoD at Bagram since 2008
 Abdul Majid Khan (Afghan Ambassador), Afghan ambassador to Japan commencing 1956
 Abdul Majid Khan Tarin (1877–1939), magistrate and politician of former British India

See also
 Ustad Abdul Majid Khan, Indian Sarangi Player